Arthur Edwin "Cy" Fried (July 23, 1897 – October 9, 1970) was a Major League Baseball pitcher who played in two games for the Detroit Tigers in .

External links

1897 births
1970 deaths
Detroit Tigers players
Major League Baseball pitchers
Baseball players from Texas